Hakeem Babatunde Haky Dee is a Nigerian entertainment entrepreneur and Radio executive. He owns Festac Radio Online.

Early life
Animashaun was born in the Kwara State, Nigeria. He studied Business Administration at Kwara State Polytechnic.

Career
He is CEO of Smooth Promotions, an entertainment firm that organizes The Headies award and publishes the weekly Hip Hop World Magazine.
On 5 November 2013 he led his firm to the launch of HipTV on Multichoice DSTV.
In October 2013, The Net magazine listed him as one of the most influential people in the Nigerian entertainment industry.

References

Living people
Nigerian entertainment industry businesspeople
Yoruba businesspeople
21st-century Nigerian businesspeople
1970 births